South Holland is a province of the Netherlands.

South Holland may also refer to:
Southern Netherlands, see Geography of the Netherlands.
South Holland, Lincolnshire, a local government district in England
South Holland and The Deepings (UK Parliament constituency), a constituency in the British House of Commons
South Holland, Illinois, a village in Illinois, United States